Nok Kundi ("the blunt point"), is a township and region in western Pakistan in the province of Balochistan. This region of western Pakistan, was historically known to these people as Dzaranga ("water producing land"). It was recorded by the Greeks and Hellenized to Drangiana in Greek literature. The original word for this region is Zaranka which means "watermill" or a "spring". This word occurs in old Balochi and Persian as "Waterland".

Climate

Nok Kundi has a hot desert climate (Köppen climate classification BWh) with extremely hot summers and mild winters. There is virtually no rainfall whole the year. The climate is very dry with just  of rainfall each year.

References

Populated places in Chagai District
Tehsils of Balochistan, Pakistan